Edward Cousins is an Irish male badminton player. In 2010, he won Irish Junior Championships in mixed doubles event. In 2012, he won the Irish Future Series tournament in mixed doubles event with his partner Keelin Fox.

References

External links
 

Living people
Irish male badminton players
Year of birth missing (living people)